A cabildo insular is the government and administration institution of each of the seven major islands in the Canary Islands archipelago: Tenerife, Fuerteventura, Gran Canaria, Lanzarote, La Palma, La Gomera and El Hierro. The island of La Graciosa falls under the jurisdiction of the cabildo of Lanzarote. 

The members of a cabildo are elected by direct universal suffrage by the Spanish citizens of each island. The membership is determined by party-list proportional representation. In Francoist Spain the members were appointed rather than elected. 

Created under the Law of Cabildos of 1912, the cabildos insulares took over powers ascribed to the provincial councils. Cabildos exercise a level of authority between those of their province and their autonomous communities in matters of health, environment, culture, sports, industry, roads, drinking water and irrigation, hunting and fishing licensing, museums, beaches, public transportation and land organization. Cabildos can impose fuel taxes.

List of cabildos insulares
There are seven cabildos:  El Hierro, Fuerteventura, Gran Canaria, La Gomera, La Palma, Lanzarote, and Tenerife.

See also
Cabildo de Tenerife
Cabildo (council)
Local government in Spain

References

External links
Tenerife 
Gran Canaria
Lanzarote   
Fuerteventura
La Palma 
La Gomera  
El Hierro

Subdivisions of Spain
Government of the Canary Islands